Julia Kristina Nyberg (née Svärdström; 17 November 1784 – 16 April 1854), was a Swedish poet and songwriter.  She published two collections of poetry and was awarded by the Swedish Academy. She wrote the vast majority of her works under the pseudonym Euphrosyne.

Biography
Julia Kristina Nyberg was born in the parish of Skultuna in Västmanland County, Sweden. Her parents, Per Svärdström (1726–1789) and  Beata Eliasdotter Almgren (1747–1799), both died while she was young. She grew up as the foster daughter of industrialist and mill owner, named Adlerwald  She moved in 1809 to Stockholm, where she was influenced the Aurora League (Aurora-förbundet) an artistic society under the leadership of Per Daniel Amadeus Atterbom. In 1822, she moved back to Skultuna and was married the same year to Anders Wilhelm Nyberg (1793 – 1851).

Nyberg is most famous for her songs written for the Walpurgis Night holiday, many of which are still sung and recorded today, including Vårvindar friska and Fruktmånglerskan med tapperhetsmedalj.  For the majority of her literary career she belonged to the circle of writers that formed around the Romantic poet Per Daniel Amadeus Atterbom and regularly published her poetry in the group's journal: Poetisk kalender.  She never aspired to the epic poetry that characterized many of her contemporaries' works, but instead focussed on writing shorter poems inspired by nature.

Bibliography
 Dikter af Euphrosyne (1822)
 Nyare Dikter af Euphrosyne (1828)
 Vublina (1828)
 Samlade Dikter af Euphrosyne (1832)
 Nya Dikter af Euphrosyne (1842)

See also 
 Anna Maria Lenngren
 Ulrika Widström

References

Further reading 
  

1784 births
1854 deaths
People from Västerås Municipality
Writers from Västmanland
Swedish women poets
Swedish-language poets
Romantic poets
19th-century Swedish writers
19th-century Swedish women writers